Zinser is a surname. Notable people with the surname include:

Adolfo Aguilar Zínser (1949–2005), Mexican diplomat and politician
Bill Zinser (1920–2001), American baseball player
Elisabeth Zinser (born 1940), American college president
Gillian Zinser (born 1985), American actress
Hartmut Zinser (born 1944), American religious scholar
John Zinser (American football) (born 1967), American football player
John Zinser (game designer), American game designer
Stephen Zinser (born. c 1958), American hedge fund manager
Wolfgang Zinser (born 1964), American triple jumper

See also
Dement-Zinser House, a historic house in Washington, Illinois, United States
Zinsser